Ghadir Investment Company (Sirhayehgâdari-ye Qâdir) was established in 1991 in Iran and entered to the "Tehran Stock Exchange (TSE)" in 1995. Its activities are managing or restructuring Iranian companies on behalf of its share holders. GHADIR is one of the biggest holding investment company in the Tehran Stock Exchange (TSE) with a market capitalization of 97,416 billion Iranian Rials as of 2017.

In 2017, GHADIR had more than 130 subsidiaries, and profits surpassing 12,000 billion rials. These subsidiary companies, in turn, contribute to the development of industry, trade and services in Iran. GHADIR also invests in private equity and venture capital in the Iranian oil & gas & petrochemical sector, as well as power & energy, mines & industries, transportation, cement & construction, and also IT & ICT.

Ghadir Investment Company Structure
Ghadir Investment is a conglomerate company (cluster company) that has been admitted to the Tehran Stock Exchange, and its cluster consists of several holding companies (parent company) which includes the following companies

 Parsian oil holding
 Holding the development of Behshahr industries
 Pars Petrochemical Co.
 Gemstone Earth
 Bandar Abbas Refinery
 Energy Investment and Enri Ghadir
 Southern Aluminum Industries Complex

Shareholders of Ghadir Investment Company

Military affiliates own 60 percent of the company's shares. Other shareholders of the company are as follows

Kowsar Insurance Company 4%

Saba Management Development Saba 3%

National Oil Company 2%

Iranian National Investment Company 1%

Eurasia Economic plan Company and Campus Investment Company are also other shareholders.

See also
Venture capital in Iran
National Iranian Petrochemical Company

References

External links
 

Investment companies of Iran
Conglomerate companies of Iran
Financial services companies established in 1991
1991 establishments in Iran
Companies listed on the Tehran Stock Exchange
Companies based in Tehran
Iranian entities subject to the U.S. Department of the Treasury sanctions